Isle of the Oneidas is an island on the Mohawk River east of Scotia in Schenectady County, New York. Variant names include Daley Island, Eldrich Island, and Eldridge Island.

References

Islands of New York (state)
Mohawk River
River islands of New York (state)